Horning is an ancient village and parish in the English county of Norfolk.
It covers an area of 11 km2 and had a population of 1,033 in the 2001 census. Horning parish lies on the northern bank of the River Bure south of the River Thurne and is located in The Broads National Park. For the purposes of local government, it falls within the district of North Norfolk, although areas alongside the rivers and broads fall into the executive area of the Broads Authority.

History

The name Horning means the "folk who live on the high ground between the rivers". Its history dates back to 1020 when the manor was given by King Canute to the newly founded Abbey of St. Benet at Hulme. The Bishop of Norwich, as Abbot of St. Benets, is still Lord of the Manor.

Horning Parish extends along the south bank of the River Bure to Thurne Mouth and includes the ruins of St Benet's Abbey & St. James Hospital. St. Benet's Abbey is a Grade I listed building, and dates back to the 9th Century. The importance of the Abbey as a medieval place of pilgrimage is reflected in the medieval finds of two papal seals, that would have secured documents from the Pope.

The Church of St. Benedict lies half a mile east of the village and dates back to the 13th Century.

Horning is situated on the River Bure (pronounced locally "Burr") between Wroxham and Ludham.  A ferry plied across the river for more than 1,000 years.

Horning has an entry in the Domesday Book, noted under the name 'Horningam'. In 1086, Horning had 18 villagers, 11 'smallholders', 4 cattle, 10 pigs, 360 sheep and the taxable value was £4.

Archaeologists have found ancient earthworks in Horning, which run alongside the River Bure, possibly dating to the early Saxon period.  The earliest ancient monument is a Bronze Age ring ditch and possible burial pit.  Neolithic and Bronze Age artefacts have also been found.

Leisure and attractions

The village of Horning is a very popular tourist destination within the Norfolk Broads, having attractions both around the village and surrounding areas.  The village lies on the north bank of the River Bure, and has many waterside properties, pubs, shops, restaurants, tea-rooms, boat-trips as well as other features to enjoy.

Horning is picturesque, and described as the prettiest village on the broads. The sights to see are: the River Bure from the landing stages, Lower Street, St. Benedicts Church and many properties with thatched roofs.

Following Lower Street to the east, leads to the school, marina, leisure centre, church and the old riverbank.  North of Horning are the broads of Barton, Alderfen and Burntfen, and village of Neatishead. West is the popular area of Hoveton & Wroxham. East lies the quaint village of Ludham.  To the south, across the river via the ferry, are Bure Marshes and village of Woodbastwick. The Ferry Inn to the east of the village was largely destroyed in a Second World War bombing raid by the German Luftwaffe on 26 April 1941, during which 15 bombs are believed to have been dropped on Horning and the surrounding area by a single aircraft. Most landed in the local marshes but one hit the ferry and one hit the Inn, where 21 of the 24 people in the pub at the time were killed. The Ferry Inn was open for business with a makeshift bar only three weeks later. 

Horning is home to "Southern Comfort" the Mississippi Cruise boat, which leaves from the staithe adjacent to The Swan Inn.

The village is popular for sail & motor boating, and Horning Sailing Club hosts regular annual events.  Several boatyards specialise in boat sales, boat hire, boat building and repairs. There are two marinas which offer private mooring facilities. The River Bure is navigable from the North Sea at Great Yarmouth all the way to Horning.

The village centre is quite small, consisting of just a single street, a village green, The Swan Inn pub (built early 19th century but dates back to 1696), a few shops and restaurants and a riverbank adjacent to the River Bure. The main Village Hall, playing fields and children's play area are located behind Lower Street on the upper side of the village.

Outside the village centre is the popular Bewilderwood theme park, which was voted best large attraction in the East of England (2009), as well as having many other UK and International awards.  Broadland Cycle Hire is located within Bewilderwood, from which there are many good cycle routes through rural areas to villages and broads.

Other local attractions nearby include Barton Broad boardwalk, Neatishead village, Ludham village, shopping in Hoveton & Wroxham.  A short distance away are many beautiful beaches such as Waxham, Sea Palling and Winterton-on-Sea, as well as the more popular holiday destinations of Great Yarmouth and Cromer.  The North Norfolk Coast is approximately 1hr away, which is a designated Area of Outstanding Natural Beauty.

Transport

Horning lies just off the A1062 road, which is a designated "Rural Route".  This Rural Route starts at Hoveton, passes through Horning, Ludham and ends in Potter Heigham.

Car
The city of Norwich is a 25 minute drive from Horning. Sprowston Park & Ride is 12 minutes away.

Train
The nearest railway station is Hoveton & Wroxham, located on the Bittern Line between Norwich and Sheringham.

Air
Norwich International Airport has scheduled flights to places such as Amsterdam, Edinburgh, Manchester and Exeter. The airport is a 26min drive away.

Bus
Horning is served by the 5B bus, operated by Konectbus.

Bicycle
There is a cycle path between Horning and Hoveton, which takes about 15 mins to cycle.  
The Norfolk Broads Cycle Centre can be found nearby at Bewilderwood.

Passenger ferry
There has been a ferry service connecting Horning and Woodbastwick for generations. The ferry connects The Ferry Inn with Woodbastwick Staithe, for access to Bure Marshes, Ranworth, Cockshoot Broad, Woodbastwick brewery and The Fur & Feather Inn.  The Horning Foot Ferry transports passengers, cycles and dogs, currently on Fridays, Saturdays and Sundays, 10.30am - 7.30pm.

Events

 Horning Boat Show (30 April 2022)
 Three Rivers Race (28 & 29 May 2022) - sailing event, over 24hrs
 Village Fete (July)
 Boat Regatta (early August)
 School Summer Fair (July)

Shops
 Post Office
 Newsagents & General Store
 The Galley - cafe, delicatessen and giftware
 JHD Interiors - curtains, blinds, upholstery
 Courtyard Cafe
 Gift Shops

Pubs

 The Swan Inn
 The Ferry Inn
 The New Inn

Restaurants
 Bure River Cottage (5-star seafood restaurant)
 Staithe & Willow

Eateries
 The Galley Cafe
 Flavours Bar & Kitchen - Ferry Marina
 Courtyard Cafe
 Country Treats Coffee Shop
 Golden City Chinese Takeaway

Places to stay
 Norfolk River Cottages 
 The Moorhen Bed and Breakfast

Recreational
 Horning Sailing Club
 GoPaddle - stand-up paddleboard adventures on the Norfolk Broads 
 Mississippi River Boat
 Canoe Hire
 Crown Green Bowling
 Children's Playground
 Playing field
 St. Benets Hall (for regular art exhibitions)
 Boat Hire - picnic boats, dinghies & cruisers

Services and facilities
 Public Toilets
 Car and Coach Park
 Public Moorings
 Pub Moorings
 Electric Hook-up
 Refuse disposal
 Marina services
 Bottle, Paper & clothing recycling banks
 Water - standpipe at Swan green
 Slipways - public slipway adjacent to The Swan Inn, 3 private slipways at Horning Sailing Club

Nearby

 Bewilderwood
 St Benet's Abbey
 RAF Neatishead
 RAF Air Defence Radar Museum
 Hoveton village
 Ludham village
 Wroxham village
 Fairhaven Woodland and Water Garden
 Potter Heigham
 Roys of Wroxham
 Wroxham Barns
 Woodforde's Brewery

Media

Arthur Ransome's books Coot Club and The Big Six were written based on his time spent in Horning. Several scenes in the books take place in the village.
The books were made into a 1984 BBC television series Swallows and Amazons Forever!.  In 2016, Swallows and Amazons was released as a major film production.
The 2015 film "45 Years" was filmed in Horning village and locally on the River Bure.

Veteran radio presenter Keith Skues lives in the village, with his collection of around 300,000 records. He presented his popular Sunday late night show on BBC Local Radio from his home many times.

Social media
 Instagram Horning_Village

Education
Horning Community Primary School
- Primary Education for 5-11 year olds
- Pre-school for 2-4 year olds

The 2016 Ofsted report rated Horning Community Primary School overall as 'Good' 

The nearest secondary school to Horning is Broadland High School in Hoveton.

Geography

Communications

In addition to the usual terrestrial TV and telephone landline services, the following communication services are available in Horning:
 Fibre Broadband (Fibre to the Cabinet FTTC)
 Broadband (ADSL)
 Digital TV & Radio
 Mobile Phone networks
 Mobile HSDPA, 3G & 4G (Vodafone currently has best signal)

External links

Horning Sailing Club
Three Rivers Race
Horning Foot Ferry Passenger ferry providing transport across the river
North Norfolk District Council
Hoveton & Wroxham Medical Centre
Tour Norfolk A guided tour of Horning
Bure River Cottage Restaurant High quality fish restaurant, serving fresh local fish
Bure Marshes, Natural Nature Reserve (NNR)
BeWILDerwood The curious treehouse adventure park
Broads by Bike Good cycle routes in the local Horning area
The Canoe Man Canoe and Kayak Hire
North Norfolk Coast AONB
The Broads National Park
Broads Authority
Burnt Fen Alpacas
Wroxham Barns
Norfolk Wildlife Trust Alderfen Broad
Norfolk Archaeological Trust St. Benets Abbey 
Historic Maps Maps of Horning: Aerial photos from 1945 & 1988; Enclosure plan from 1800; Tithe map from 1840; and Ordnance Survey 1st edition
Norfolk Museums Collections 
Norfolk Heritage Explorer - Map Map of Archaeological Areas & Buildings in Horning
Norfolk Heritage Explorer NHER record for St. Benet's Abbey
History of the Benedictine Monks at St. Benet's Abbey
Horning Aerial video footage
Horning Postmill
Mill Loke Postmill Mill Loke Postmill photo from 1875
Broadland Memories Photos of Horning circa 1870 of the waterfront, maltings, mill, Swan corner
The New Inn pub
The Swan Inn pub
The Ferry Inn pub
Liberty Restaurant Wroxham 
Roys The world's largest village store
Photos of Horning on Flickr.com
Horning History Essay on Horning from 1810
Horning Parish Council

References

Norfolk Broads
Villages in Norfolk
Civil parishes in Norfolk
North Norfolk